Raum is a demon depicted as a crow.

Raum may also refer to:

 Raum Energy Inc., a Canadian wind turbine manufacturer
 Toyota Raum, an automobile

People 
 Raum the Old, a legendary king of Norway
 Arnold Raum (1908–1999), American jurist
 Elizabeth Raum (born 1945), Canadian oboist and composer
 Erika Raum, Canadian violinist
 Green Berry Raum (1829–1909), American politician
 Michael Raum (born 1965), German entrepreneur

See also
 
 Rauma (disambiguation)

Surnames from given names
German toponymic surnames